Kaye Gibbons (born May 5, 1960) is an American novelist. Her first novel, Ellen Foster (1987), received the Sue Kaufman Prize for First Fiction from the American Academy and Institute of Arts and Letters, a Special Citation from the Ernest Hemingway Foundation and the Louis D. Rubin, Jr. Prize in Creative Writing from the University of North Carolina at Chapel Hill.  Gibbons is a member of the Fellowship of Southern Writers and two of her books, Ellen Foster and A Virtuous Woman, were selected for Oprah's Book Club in 1998.

Gibbons was born in Nash County, North Carolina, and went to Rocky Mount Senior High School. She attended North Carolina State University and the University of North Carolina at Chapel Hill, studying American and English literature. She has three daughters.

Gibbons has bipolar disorder and notes that she is extremely creative during her manic phases, in which she believes that everything is instrumented by a "real magic". Ellen Foster was written during one such phase.

On November 2, 2008, Gibbons was arrested on prescription drug fraud charges. According to authorities, she was taken into custody while trying to pick up a fraudulent prescription for the painkiller hydrocodone. She was sentenced to a 90-day suspended sentence, 2 years probation, and a $300 fine.

Works
Ellen Foster (1987)
A Virtuous Woman (1989)
A Cure for Dreams (1991)
Charms for the Easy Life (1993)
Sights Unseen (1995)
On the Occasion of My Last Afternoon (1998)
Divining Women (2004)
The Life All Around Me (2005)

References

External links
 Kaye Gibbons papers at the University of South Carolina Irvin Department of Rare Books and Special Collections.
 Interview with Kaye Gibbons at Womankind Education & Resource Center

1960 births
Living people
20th-century American novelists
21st-century American novelists
American women novelists
Writers from Raleigh, North Carolina
People from Rocky Mount, North Carolina
Writers from Syracuse, New York
People with bipolar disorder
University of North Carolina at Chapel Hill alumni
20th-century American women writers
21st-century American women writers
Criminals from North Carolina
American people convicted of fraud
Novelists from New York (state)
Novelists from North Carolina